Jack Leslie Clark (November 25, 1925 – July 21, 1988) was an American television personality, game show host, and announcer. He is best known for hosting The Cross-Wits, and as an offstage announcer for Password and Wheel of Fortune. On the latter, he succeeded original announcer Charlie O'Donnell and held the role from 1980 until his death in 1988. (O'Donnell took back the announcing position until his own death in 2010.)

Early career
When Clark was a student at UC Berkeley, he began his career as a substitute radio announcer for radio station KROW in Oakland.

After graduating from UC Berkeley, he moved to New York City, and first worked as a game show announcer for Password (where, when the word was flashed on the screen, he would whisper from offstage, "the password is...;" he also occasionally substituted for host Allen Ludden). From there, he went on to host 100 Grand (1963) and Dealer's Choice from 1974-75 (replacing Bob Hastings).

Later, Clark hosted The Cross-Wits from 1975 until 1980, where he was noted for his rapport with the celebrities and contestants. Clark later went on to announce for several other game shows, including Split Second (1972–1975), Tattletales (1974), Three for the Money (1975), Second Chance (1977), and some Hollywood-originated episodes of The $10,000 Pyramid. Earlier in 1967, Clark also did some commercials for Winston cigarettes in Super King (100 MM) size.

Clark also hosted a number of pilot episodes that never passed that stage. Among them were Second Guessers, The $10,000 Sweep, and a 1985 proposed revival of Now You See It (later sold in 1989). He was also the announcer on another pilot, Monday Night Quarterback. Clark did many of these pilots "on spec" as favors to their producers. During his tenure with The Cross-Wits, Clark also hosted Say Powwww (1979), a live, interactive game series on Metromedia stations in California.

Wheel of Fortune and later career
After Wheel of Fortune announcer Charlie O'Donnell's departure from the show in 1980, Clark was chosen to become the show's regular announcer. During that time, Clark announced the daytime version and the primetime syndicated version, when the show's ratings peaked. Clark also announced for other television programs in the 1980s, including The $25,000 Pyramid (1982–1985), as well as being a spokesman for National Geographic magazine, appearing on-camera in their commercials.

Illness and death
In 1988, Clark was diagnosed with bone cancer. He continued announcing for Wheel of Fortune for as long as he was able to keep it up until the end of the 1987–88 season. During that time, hosts Pat Sajak and Vanna White announced the fee plugs on the syndicated version. When he was away, Charlie O'Donnell and Johnny Gilbert began filling in as substitute announcers. 

Clark died on July 21, 1988 at the age of 62, just before production of the 1988–1989 season was to begin, and is interred at Glendale's Forest Lawn Memorial Park.

He had requested that O'Donnell return to take his place, but since O'Donnell was not available due to his prior obligations with Barris Industries, Los Angeles-area disc jockey M.G. Kelly announced from mid-1988 to February 1989, when O'Donnell returned to the show. O'Donnell remained as the announcer until his death in 2010.

References

External links

1925 births
1988 deaths
Game show announcers
American game show hosts
People from St. Joseph, Missouri
People from Los Angeles
University of California, Berkeley alumni
Deaths from bone cancer
Deaths from cancer in California
Burials at Forest Lawn Memorial Park (Glendale)